Mouloud "the dude" Sihali (born March 1976 in Algeria) was a suspect in the Wood Green ricin plot.  He arrived as an illegal immigrant in the UK in 1997, having left Algeria to avoid national service. He was arrested on 19 Sep 2002 on suspicion of having the intent to poison as part of a terror attack in the UK, and was charged on 22 January 2003. No evidence of production of the poison ricin was presented at the trial, which opened in September 2004 at the Old Bailey. Sihali was acquitted of the charges in April 2005, but was re-arrested on 15 September 2005, and held as a terrorist suspect.  He is now awaiting extradition to Algeria. There is concern that he could be arrested and tortured if deported to Algeria.

References 
 Vanity Fair's article on Mouloud Sihali, Feb 2008, No. 570
 Statement by Mouloud Sihali (MSWord document)
 BBC Interview with Mouloud Sihali (audio)
 "Taking Liberties" website
 "Algeria Watch" article on fears for safety on return to Algeria
 "Cageprisoners" Profile of Mouloud Sihali

1976 births
Living people
Algerian people imprisoned abroad
Algerian emigrants to England
Prisoners and detainees of England and Wales